Patrick O. O'Meara (7 January 1938 – 30 March 2021) was a South African-born author of Rhodesia: Racial Conflict or Co-Existence?, Southern Africa in Crisis (co-editor, Gwendolen M. Carter), and Africa (co-editor, Phyllis Martin).

O’Meara was a professor of political science and vice president emeritus of Indiana University.

Works 
 Rhodesia: Racial Conflict or Co-Existence? (1975), Ithaca and London Cornell University Press, ASIN: B000P74RUC
 Southern Africa in Crisis (1977), co-editor, Gwendolen M. Carter, Indiana University Press, 
 Africa (1977), co-editor, Phyllis Martin, Indiana University Press, 
 Southern Africa: The Continuing Crisis (A Midland Book), 1979, co-editor, Gwendolen M. Carter, 
 International Politics in Southern Africa (A Midland Book), 1982, co-editor, Gwendolen M. Carter, 
 Globalization and the Challenges of a New Century 2000, Indiana University Press, 
 Changing Perspectives on International Education, 2001, Indiana University Press,

Honours 
 John W. Ryan Award for International Programs, 1993
 Thomas Hart Benton Medallion, 1994
 Indiana University President's Medal for Excellence, 2011
 Golden Cross of Merit of the Republic of Hungary

See also 
 O. Timothy O'Meara (brother)

References

External links
 NPR, Indiana Public Media Profiles
 IMDb, Strong Medicine Consultant
 Inside Indiana Business
 Indiana University President's Medal for Excellence
 Indiana University News Room

1938 births
2021 deaths
American political scientists
South African emigrants to the United States
White South African people
Indiana University faculty
Recipients of the Order of Merit of the Republic of Hungary